Wallapop is a Spanish company founded in 2014 used to exchange used goods, similar to Craigslist as a classified listings website. The marketplace primarily is accessed via mobile app.

In 2014 it signed a commercial agreement with Atresmedia. In 2015 it was cited as the startup company with the highest revenues in Spain with $1b of transactions completed using the app.

In May 2016, the company was merged with Letgo but continues to trade under the Wallapop brand.

Large venture capital investors include Mangrove Capital, Northzone, and Eight Roads Ventures.

References

External links
  

Companies based in Barcelona
Atresmedia
Spanish companies established in 2014
Retail companies established in 2014
Internet properties established in 2014
Online marketplaces of Spain
Online marketplaces of the United States
2016 mergers and acquisitions
Internet technology companies of Spain